Brockway may refer to:

Places
In the United States:
 Brockway, California
 Brockway, Montana 
 Brockway, Oregon
 Brockway, Pennsylvania 
 Brockway, Wisconsin, a town
 Brockway (community), Wisconsin, an unincorporated community
 Brockway Township, Michigan
 Brockway Township, Minnesota

People
 Archibald Fenner Brockway, British anti-war activist and politician
 Buzz Brockway, American politician
 Benjamin Benson Brockway, Oregon pioneer
 Derek Brockway, Welsh meteorologist and TV presenter
 Hiel Brockway, Businessman
 Lawrence O. Brockway, Physical chemist
 Robin Brockway, British actor
 Zebulon Brockway, penologist and prison reformer

Other
 Brockway Air, Vermont-based regional airline
 Brockway Airport, New Brunswick, Canada
 Brockway Motor Company, Cortland NY 1912-1977
 Brockway Mountain Drive, scenic drive on the Keweenaw Peninsula of Michigan, USA
 Brockway (The Simpsons), fictional location on the TV animated series The Simpsons
 Brockway Glass, Pennsylvania-based glass manufacturer